The 1887 Vermont Green and Gold football team represented the University of Vermont during the 1887 college football season. The Green and Gold finished the season with an 0–2 record.

Schedule

References

Vermont
Vermont Catamounts football seasons
College football winless seasons
Vermont Green and Gold football